Cherish Lily Perrywinkle (December 24, 2004 – June 22, 2013) was an 8-year-old girl from Jacksonville, Florida who was abducted from a Walmart on June 21, 2013. She was seen on CCTV cameras leaving the store with a man named Donald James Smith (born September 4, 1956) who was later convicted of her murder and sentenced to death.

Life and murder
Cherish Lily Perrywinkle was born in Jacksonville, Florida on Christmas Eve of 2004 to Rayne Perrywinkle and Billy Jarreau, who were never married and had custody battles.

On June 21, 2013, around 8 pm, Rayne, Cherish, and her two younger sisters went shopping when they first met Donald Smith at a Dollar General, where he offered to buy them clothes they could not afford with a $150 Walmart gift card. The Perrywinkles then got into his white van and went with him to Walmart, where they shopped for the next 2 hours. At 10:30 pm, Smith offered to get them cheeseburgers at the store's McDonald's and Cherish followed him. However, surveillance footage shows that they walked out of the store instead, which was the last time Cherish was seen alive. About half an hour later, Rayne called the police to report that her daughter had been abducted; an Amber alert was issued five hours later. The next morning Cherish's body was found in a creek behind Highlands Baptist Church. It is believed that Smith had bound her in the back of his van, where she was sexually assaulted and strangled to death.

Smith's arrest
Police immediately identified Smith as the abductor, with his van being one of the main focuses. Around 9 am the next day, officers saw his van on the interstate and cornered him before he surrendered and was promptly arrested. Smith was known to police as a local sex offender with a long criminal history including numerous offenses against minors. He had been released from jail only three weeks before Cherish's murder.

Trial
Smith's trial began in February 2018. He was found guilty of first-degree murder and sexual battery and was sentenced to death in May 2018. The jurors were in tears after witnessing crime scene photos of the murder as the defense tried to suppress the images. Julie Schlax, the defense attorney, urged the jurors to focus on the law and not their raw emotions.

In April 2021, Smith unsuccessfully attempted to appeal his sentence.

See also
 List of death row inmates in the United States
 List of kidnappings
 List of murdered American children

References

Cited works and further reading

External links
 2019 Florida Times-Union article detailing the abduction and murder of Cherish Perrywinkle
 Contemporary news article pertaining to the U.S. Supreme Court rejection of Donald James Smith's appeal following his conviction of Perrywinkle's murder
 Donald James Smith, Appellant, v. State of Florida, Appellee: Details of Smith's 2021 appeal against his conviction

2013 in Florida
2010s missing person cases
2013 murders in the United States
21st century in Jacksonville, Florida
Deaths by person in Florida
Deaths by strangulation in the United States
Female murder victims
Formerly missing people
Incidents of violence against girls
June 2013 crimes in the United States
Kidnapped American children
Missing person cases in Florida
Murdered American children
Murder in Florida
Sexual assaults in the United States